Ah Kung Kok Fishermen Village is a village in Sha Tin District, Hong Kong.

History
Ah Kung Kok Fishermen Village was established in 1984 to re-house villagers affected by the reclamation works for building Sha Tin Racecourse and Ma On Shan new town.

See also
 Fishermen villages in Hong Kong

References

External links

 Delineation of area of existing village Ah Kung Kok Fishermen Village (Sha Tin) for election of resident representative (2019 to 2022)

Villages in Sha Tin District, Hong Kong